Doniyor Abdumannopov (born 12 October 2000) is a Uzbekistani professional footballer who plays for Navbahor Namangan.

References

External links 
 
 

2000 births
Living people
Uzbekistani footballers
Uzbekistani expatriate footballers
Expatriate footballers in Belarus
Association football midfielders
FK Andijon players
FC Energetik-BGU Minsk players
FC Sogdiana Jizzakh players
Navbahor Namangan players